A garage door is a large door on a garage that opens either manually or by an electric motor (a garage door opener). Garage doors are frequently large enough to accommodate automobiles and other vehicles. Small garage doors may be made in a single panel that tilts up and back across the garage ceiling. Larger doors are usually made in several jointed panels that roll up on tracks across the garage ceiling, or into a roll above the doorway. The operating mechanism is spring-loaded or counterbalanced to offset the weight of the door and reduce the human or motor effort required to operate the door. Less commonly, some garage doors slide or swing horizontally. Doors are made of wood, metal, or fiberglass, and may be insulated to prevent heat loss. Warehouses, bus garages and locomotive sheds have larger versions.

Description

A typical version of an overhead garage door used in the past would have been built as a one-piece panel. The panel was mounted on each side with unequal parallelogram style hinge lifting mechanism. Newer versions of overhead garage doors are now generally built from several panels hinged together that roll along a system of tracks guided by rollers. The weight of the door may be  or more, but is balanced by either a torsion spring system or a pair of extension springs. A remote controlled motorized mechanism for opening garage doors adds convenience, safety, and security.

History
The history of the garage door could date back to 450 BC when chariots were stored in gatehouses, but in the United States, they arose around the start of the 20th century.
As early as 1902, American manufacturers—including Cornell Iron Works—published catalogs featuring a "float over door." Evidence of an upward-lifting garage door can be found in a catalog in 1906.

Single panel garage doors

Single panel doors are constructed from one monolithic panel. From the closed position a single panel door swings up and overhead with a hinge on each side (known as jamb type hardware) to the fully open position. A disadvantage of monolithic panel doors is that the swing-up arc of the door occurs partially outside the garage. This means a vehicle must stop and park several feet in front of the door to avoid being hit by the garage door when it is opened.

Single panel doors can also be installed with (one piece track type hardware) that folds the door back with a single horizontal track on each side (which is mounted at the top of the wood frame) and a roller, (mounted to the top of the door on each side. A hinge on each side that attaches to the bottom of each side of the garage door. Using track hardware, a car can be parked much closer to the door, as the whole door, when in the open position, rests completely inside of the garage door header. Track type hardware has much less arc when raising and lowering the garage door as opposed to jamb type hardware.

Sectional garage doors

Sectional doors are usually constructed of three to eight panels and slide up and overhead. Sectional doors occupy exactly the same amount of internal garage space as a monolithic door. Sectional doors have two advantages over single panel monolithic doors:
 Sectional doors do not require any space outside the garage to open. A vehicle may park very close to the garage before opening the door.
 Each panel of a sectional door has its own connection to the door track. This increases reliability and robustness compared to monolithic doors, which have only a few track connections for the whole panel.

Garage doors can be made out of many materials, but steel, aluminum, wood, copper, glass, and vinyl (polyethylene) are the most popular materials. Some manufacturers incorporate foamed-in-place polyurethane insulation within the monolithic panel and sectional garage doors.

The side sliding sectional door
 A lot of space under the garage ceiling.
 Can use the entire ceiling of the garage.
 Fast access to the garage

Roller doors

Roller doors (sometimes called "sheet doors") are usually constructed of corrugated steel. They evolved from cover window and door coverings. Other materials can be used (e.g.; transparent corrugated fibreglass) where strong impact resistance is not required. Corrugations give the door strength against impacts. A typical single-car garage roller door has a preloaded spring inside the rolling mechanism. The spring reduces the effort required to open the door. Larger roller doors in commercial premises are not sprung (except in the US) and use a manual pulley and chain system or a geared motor to raise and lower (roll up and roll down) the door. Roller doors cannot be effectively insulated.

In the UK (and other parts of the EU), 'insulated' roller garage doors are available, using an aluminium lathe filled with polyurethane foam for thermal and acoustic insulation.

The common use of roller doors in Australian garages is discussed at Garage (residential) § In Australia.

In terms of thermal insulation, the roller door has a typical insulation R-value of 4.9 to 5.2. A sheet steel garage door has a typical insulation R-value of 0.5 to 2.7.

An application that needs more thermal insulation typically uses foam filled sectional garage door, which provides typical insulation R-values of 6.1 to 6.4.

Although roller doors are very reliable, the rollers themselves tend to require some maintenance or replacement from time to time. Steel rollers require frequent lubricant and plastic ones tend to get replaced more often than others. There are "do-it-yourself" guides online for lubricating or replacing garage door rollers.

Garage door materials
 Aluminum garage doors are usually found in commercial settings and not common for residential garage doors. Aluminum is typically only used for full view garage doors ( doors which are made up of glass sections divided by aluminum stiles). Aluminum doors are rust-proof, and low maintenance. 
 Fiberglass and vinyl garage doors are composite units, combining a steel core behind a fiberglass or vinyl skin. They have also polyurethane insulated base sections or other types of foam insulation. These premium doors can match steel garage doors, and be a realistic imitation of wood (namely fiberglass units), but they may be more expensive than steel units. Fiberglass doors are commonly used near the ocean where salt water can ruin regular steel doors. 
 Steel doors are the most common garage doors in today's market. They are available in a variety of sizes and styles, provide strength and security, are cost-competitive, and may have optional insulating value. Extra strength is available with two or three layers of galvanized steel with a low gauge number (0.6 - 0.7 mm steel panels).
 Wood garage doors offer aesthetic appeal, but they are high-maintenance and may be expensive. Low-priced wood garage doors may warp and break easily.

Steel stamped construction

A common material for a new garage door is steel sheet formed or stamped to look like a raised panel wooden door. Steel doors are available in uninsulated, insulated, and a 3 layer door also known as a sandwich style door. A design mimicking carriage house doors has become popular since the early 2000s, and many manufacturers clad the exterior of a steel door with composite, vinyl boards, or other trim to give it the appearance of wood.

Insulation
In situations involving residential attached garages where the insulating value and the energy efficiency of a garage door is important to prevent overheating and freezing problems, as well as for comfort and energy savings.

Some manufacturers advertise very high insulating values for some of their garage doors (R-15 to R-17), but it may be true only for some central sections. The actual R-values – for the entire door – are often 1/2 or 1/3 of the advertised value.

Torsion spring lift mechanism
A torsion spring counterbalance system consists of one or two tightly wound up springs on a steel shaft with cable drums at both ends. The entire apparatus mounts on the header wall above the garage door and has three supports: a center bearing plate with a steel or nylon bearing and two end bearing plates at both ends. The springs themselves consist of the steel wire with a stationary cone at one end and a winding cone at the other end. The stationary cone is attached to the center bearing plate. The winding cone consists of holes every 90 degrees for winding the springs and two set screws to secure the springs to the shaft. Steel counterbalance cables run from the roller brackets at the bottom corners of the door to a notch in the cable drums. When the door is raised, the springs unwind and the stored tension lifts the door by turning the shaft, thus turning the cable drums, wrapping the cables around the grooves on the cable drums. When the door is lowered, the cables unwrap from the drums and the springs are rewound to full tension.

Life of torsion spring
Garage door manufacturers typically produce garage doors fitted with torsion springs that provide a minimum of 10,000 to 15,000 cycles and are guaranteed for three to seven years. One cycle is a single opening and closing sequence. Most manufacturers offer a 30,000 cycle spring. However, it is important to remember that if the weight of the garage door is increased by adding glass, additional insulation, or even several coats of paint, the life of the torsion spring may be greatly reduced. Additionally, springs in highly humid environments, such as coastal regions tend to have a significantly shorter cycle life, due to the corrosive cracking.

Other factors like poor garage door maintenance, loose tracks, or components shorten torsion spring life. Owners are advised to avoid applying grease to garage door tracks because that makes the wheels "skate" in the track instead of turning on their bearings. Only bearings, hinges, and spring wire require lubricant.

Extension spring lift mechanism
An extension spring counterbalance system consists of a pair of stretched springs running parallel to the horizontal tracks. The springs lift the door through a system of pulleys and counterbalance cables running from the bottom corner brackets through the pulleys. When the door is raised, the springs contract, thus lifting the door as the tension is released. Typically these springs are made of 11 gauge (3 mm) galvanized steel, and the lengths of these springs are based on the height of the garage door in question. Their lifting weight capacity can best be identified by the color that is painted on the ends of the springs.

Maintenance
Maintenance of garage door is described in the manufacturer's instructions and consists of periodic checks for correct operation, visual inspection of parts, and lubrication.

Safety
Garage doors can cause injury and property damage (including expensive damage to the door itself) in several different ways. The most common causes of injury from garage door systems include falling doors, pinch points, improperly adjusted opener force settings and safety eyes, attempts at do-it-yourself repair without the proper knowledge or tools, and uncontrolled release of spring tension (on torsion spring systems).

A garage door with a broken spring, or the wrong strength spring, can fall. Because the effective mass of the door increases as the garage door sections transfer from the horizontal to vertical door tracks, a falling garage door accelerates rapidly. A free-falling garage door can cause serious injury or death.

The sections and rollers on garage doors represent a major pinch hazard. Children should never be allowed near a moving garage door for this reason. On manually operated garage doors, handles should be installed vertically, to promote "vertical orientation of the hand".

Mechanical garage door openers can pull or push a garage door with enough force to injure or kill people and pets if they become trapped. All modern openers are equipped with “force settings” that make the door reverse if it encounters too much resistance while closing or opening. Any garage door opener sold in the United States after 1992 requires safety eyes—sensors that prevent the door from closing if obstructed. Force settings should cause a door to stop or reverse on encountering more than approximately 20 lbs (9.07 kg) of resistance. Safety eyes should be installed a maximum of six inches above the ground. Many garage door injuries, and nearly all garage door-related property damage, can be avoided by following these precautions.

Certain parts, especially springs, cables, bottom brackets, and spring anchor plates, are under extreme tension. Injuries can occur if parts under tension are removed.

Extension spring systems should always be restrained by a safety cable that runs through the middle of the spring, tying off to a solid point at the rear and front of the horizontal door track. The safety cable prevents hazards to bystanders when a spring, pulley, or cable breaks under tension and makes the system quite safe.

Torsion spring systems can be very dangerous as they are always under tension and release energy when the spring fails. Serious injury or death can be caused by the projectile pieces of a failed torsion spring. Many people have been injured or killed trying to adjust torsion springs, and special training and procedures are required to safely adjust a torsion spring, it is a job for a professional not a homeowner or DIYer.

References

External links

American inventions
Doors
Garages (residential)